the 2022 CAFA Women's Futsal Championship was an international women's futsal tournament held in Dushanbe, Tajikistan from 21 to 28 January 2022. The four women's national teams involved in the tournament were required by Central Asian Football Association (CAFA) to register a squad of 14 players, including at least two goalkeepers.

This article lists the women's national futsal squads that take part in the tournament. The age listed for each player is as of January 21, 2022, the first day of the tournament.

Teams

Iran
Head coach: Forouzan Soleimani

Iran announced their final squad, containing 13 players rather than the allowed 14.

Kyrgyz Republic
Head coach: Oleg Gevlenko

Tajikistan
Head coach: Shamshod Niyatbekov

Uzbekistan
Head coach: Farrukh Zakirov

References

External links
 Official website

Futsal in Tajikistan